Make Your Own Kind of Music may refer to:
Make Your Own Kind of Music, a 1969 re-release of Bubblegum, Lemonade, and... Something for Mama
"Make Your Own Kind of Music" (song), a song recorded by "Mama" Cass Elliot in 1969 
Make Your Own Kind of Music (TV series), a 1971 American television series starring The Carpenters